Davide Savi (born 14 November 1995) is an Italian football player. He plays for USD Pagazzanese.

Club career
He made his Serie C debut for FeralpiSalò on 20 December 2014 in a game against Lumezzane.

For the 2019–20 season, he joined Serie D club Pontisola. Savi then moved to USD Pagazzanese in the Prima Categoria in December 2019.

References

External links
 

1995 births
People from Treviglio
Living people
Italian footballers
Italian expatriate footballers
Association football defenders
Serie C players
Serie D players
Atalanta B.C. players
FeralpiSalò players
A.C. Renate players
S.S. Ischia Isolaverde players
Mosta F.C. players
A.C. Ponte San Pietro Isola S.S.D. players
Italian expatriate sportspeople in Malta
Expatriate footballers in Malta
Sportspeople from the Province of Bergamo
Footballers from Lombardy